Charles Roark may refer to:
 Charles W. Roark (1887–1929), U.S. Representative from Kentucky
 Charles Thomas Irvine Roark (1895–1939), English polo player